A .223 Wylde chamber ( need to be updated, .223 and 5.56 have same max pressure. This was a Legend due to the fact that .223 and 5.56 don't use same pressure protocol mesure. With the CIP protocol both.223 and 5.56 have same max pressure arround 62000 PSI. You can see that Here for example : https://en.m.wikipedia.org/wiki/.223_Remington )

Background 
In 1957, during research into development of a military .22 caliber rifle, the Remington .222 Special was created by a joint effort of Fairchild Industries, Remington Arms, and U.S. Continental Army Command. At the time, several .222 caliber cartridges were under development for civilian rifles, so the .222 Special was renamed to .223 Remington. The cartridge became the standard intermediate cartridge for the United States Army in 1962, as the M193 Cartridge.

In 1972 Fabrique Nationale (FN) created a new type of service ammunition for NATO.  It was based on the .223 Remington cartridge being used by the U.S. Army but had greater range and effectiveness. The first iteration of this ammunition was type designated SS109.

.223 Rem cartridges can safely be fired from a 5.56 NATO chamber with reduced accuracy, but not safely vice versa because .223 Rem chambers have lower pressure ratings than the 5.56 NATO.  As most rifle makers moved to support the 5.56mm NATO specification, the reduced accuracy was considered a problem.

Chamber dimensions 
Bill Wylde of Greenup, Illinois, compared the two cartridges and changed the chamber of the rifle's barrel to a specification called the .223 Wylde chamber. The chamber is made with the external dimensions and lead angle found in the military 5.56×45mm NATO cartridge and the 0.2240 inch freebore diameter found in the civilian SAAMI .223 Remington cartridge.  Rifles with a .223 Wylde chamber will typically accept both .223 Remington and 5.56×45mm NATO ammunition.  

While the .223 Remington and 5.56×45mm NATO chambers have slightly different dimension, the cartridges are identical in exterior dimension.  The chamber dimension differences are often confused with the cartridge dimensions, and it is often erroneously thought that the cartridges have different dimensions. However, the cartridges are loaded to different pressure levels (55,000 psi vs 62,000 psi), with the 5.56 NATO being greater. The .223 Wylde chamber allows the use of both pressure levels safely, while also increasing accuracy potential across the range of potential bullet selections.

Wylde's hybrid chamber was designed to exploit the accuracy advantages of the .223 Remington chambering without problems concerning over pressure or compromising the functional reliability of semi-automatic firearms like the AR-15 family of rifles when using 5.56×45mm NATO military ammunition.  Coincidentally, it can shoot the relatively long and heavy  bullets commonly used in Sport Rifle Competitions very well, and is one of the preferred chambers for that task.  The .223 Wylde chamber is used by rifle manufacturers who sell "National Match" configuration AR-15 rifles, barrels and upper receivers.

Comparison 
The major dimensional difference between the chambers that fire the .223 Remington and the 5.56 x 45 NATO is the longer and larger-diameter "freebore" in the 5.56 chamber (0.0566" vs 0.0250" length, 0.2265 vs 0.2240 diameter). Freebore is a short and smooth section of the barrel that is located after the case mouth, located before the start of the rifling "grooves and lands". The standard Wylde-spec chamber uses an even longer freebore length of 0.0619, to allow longer bullets (and thus heavier) to be assembled at the absolute maximum "Cartridge Over All Length" (COAL). The freebore of a chamber can be special-ordered in a variety of lengths.  

The larger diameter of the 5.56 freebore allows for continued functioning when experiencing minor fouling of gunpowder residue build-up, which is essential for the rapid firing of high volumes of ammunition in combat.  

The .223 Remington cartridge is currently manufactured to be used as a single-shot in a bolt-action rifle, so the .223 chamber benefits from a slightly tighter dimension in several places, compared to the 5.56 NATO. The slightly "looser fit" in the military 5.56 chamber increases operational reliability during rapid cartridge insertion and extraction. This is of special interest when taking into consideration any minor manufacturing variances in the ammunition, and also minor case dents acquired during transportation during combat. This cycling reliability is of intense concern when using the 5.56 NATO cartridge in a light machine gun, such as the M249, as well as the general-purpose M4 combat rifle.

The larger-diameter 5.56 freebore can occasionally have a minor detrimental effect on accuracy on any given random shot, when using the standard combat 62 grain M855 cartridge. The .223 Wylde-spec chamber uses the slightly looser 5.56 NATO chamber dimensions around the case for cycling reliability in a semi-auto firearm, along with the tighter freebore of the .223 Remington for a more consistent accuracy. 

It has been commonly stated that a 5.56 chamber can fire a .223 cartridge without concern, but firing a 5.56 cartridge in a .223 chamber is ill-advised. To further clarify, a given .223 Remington-chambered rifle may be able to safely withstand the elevated chamber pressures of a 5.56 NATO cartridge, but they are not required to be manufactured to do so. All ".223 Wylde" marked barrels are required to meet the higher pressure standard.

References

External links
Brownells Tech Tip: AR-15 5.56/.223/.223 Wylde
Chamber Choices ('Guns Magazine')

Firearm components
AR Rifle Components
5.56×45mm NATO